Szentgotthárd is the westernmost town of Hungary. It is situated on the Rába River near the Austrian border.

History
The town took its name from, and grew up round, the Cistercian Szentgotthárd Abbey, founded here in 1183.

In 1664, it was the site of the Battle of Saint Gotthard, where an Austrian army led by Raimondo Montecuccoli defeated the Ottoman Empire so that the Turks had to agree to the Peace of Vasvár, which held until 1683.

A second Battle of Saint Gotthard in 1705 was a victory for Rákóczi's anti-Habsburg Hungarian rebels.

During World War II, Szentgotthárd was captured by Soviet troops of the 3rd Ukrainian Front on 31 March 1945 in the course of the Vienna Offensive.

Notable people
Ferenc Joachim (1882–1964), painter
Alajos Drávecz (1866–1915), Slovenian ethnologist and writer
Ágoston Pável (1886–1946), Hungarian Slovene writer and poet, graduated here
János Brenner (1931–1957), Roman Catholic priest, died here
Irén Pavlics (1934–2022), Hungarian Slovene author and editor
Tibor Gécsek (born 1964), hammer thrower
Krisztián Pars (born 1982), hammer thrower

Twin towns – sister cities

Szentgotthárd is twinned with:

 Delle, France
 Dilovası, Turkey
 Frumoasa, Romania
 Izola, Slovenia
 Lendava, Slovenia
 Tarvisio, Italy
 Walldürn, Germany

References

External links

 in Hungarian, English, German and Slovenian
Page of Opel Hungary (Szentgotthárd plant)

Populated places in Vas County